Rudolf Leopold (1 March 1925 – 29 June 2010) was an Austrian art collector, whose collection of 5,000 works of art was purchased by the Government of Austria and used to create the Leopold Museum, of which he was made director for life. Claims had been made by Jewish survivors of the Holocaust that some of the pieces in the collection were Nazi plunder and should be returned to their rightful owners.

Biography 
Leopold was born on 1 March 1925 in Vienna, and said in interviews that he had escaped conscription by the Nazis by hiding in a small village in a remote part of Austria. He earned his medical degree from the Medical University of Vienna.

He started actively collecting art in the mid-1950s, with a major early focus being pieces by Egon Schiele, whose works were available inexpensively at the time. Other Austrian artists who he collected included Gustav Klimt and Oskar Kokoschka. The wonder he felt from seeing the art during a 1947 visit to the Kunsthistorisches Museum in Vienna, a day he called "one of the most important days in my life", led Leopold to start a collection of his own. His first acquisition was a work by Friedrich Gauermann in 1947, which he paid for in exchange for tutoring. He acquired a catalogue of Schiele's work in 1950 and became enamored with the artist's work, despite the fact that he was distinctly out of fashion. Pieces that Rudolf bought for a few dollars would later be worth hundreds of thousands.

He was especially noted for bringing public attention and appreciation to the work of Schiele, whose nude drawings had been considered pornographic at times. Leopold wrote the 1973 illustrated book Egon Schiele, which was published by Phaidon Press and included 228 of the artist's work along with selected poems.

In 1994, the Austrian government agreed to purchase the collection for one-third of its appraised value of $500 million, with the works to be displayed at what was to become the Leopold Museum in Vienna, of which he was made director for life. The museum opened to the public in 2001.

Leopold lived in the Vienna suburb of Grinzing in a modest home that he and his wife had lived in together for decades, which housed the many works of art that he continued to amass, even after the bulk of his collection had been purchased by the state. Leopold died at age 85 on 29 June 2010 in Vienna due to multiple organ failure. He was survived by his wife Elisabeth, as well as by a daughter, two sons and four grandchildren.

Leopold was awarded the Austrian Cross of Honour for Science and Art, 1st class in 1997.

Problematic provenances from the Nazi era 
Egon Schiele: The Leopold Collection, a 1997 exhibit of pieces he had collected that was shown in New York City at the Museum of Modern Art drew attention because of the questioned provenance of two pieces included in the exhibit. Holland Cotter, in his review of the exhibition in The New York Times, noted that Schiele and his "X-rated subject matter" is rarely seen in U.S. museums. In December, 1997, Judith H. Dobrzynski wrote an investigative piece about Leopold's collecting, uncovering the connection between him and Lea Bondi Jaray, who owned "Portrait of Wally" before World War II, as well as other questionable purchases made by Leopold. Dobrzynski's article led the Bondi family to write to MoMA requesting that it be held in New York.

Dead City III was claimed by the heirs of Fritz Grünbaum, an artist who had been killed in 1941 at the Dachau concentration camp. Portrait of Wally, a painting of Walburga "Wally" Neuzil, was claimed by the family of Lea Bondi Jaray, a Jewish art dealer from Austria who had been forced to flee to London to escape the Nazis. In January 1998, Manhattan District Attorney Robert M. Morgenthau served a subpoena on the Museum of Modern Art, demanding that the museum hold on to the two artworks in question and not return them to the Leopold Museum, a move that left many in the art world "shocked". Leopold insisted that he had not dealt in looted art, saying "I'm not a Nazi and I'm not a Nazi profiteer". While Dead City III was ultimately returned to the Leopold Museum, Portrait of Wally has been the subject of a protracted court battle in U.S. federal and state courts with heirs alleging that Leopold knew that the painting had been Nazi loot when he purchased it. A 2008 study of the works in the Leopold Museum, commissioned by a group of Austrian Jews, found that at least 11 pieces of art there had belonged to victims of the Nazis and that Leopold had reason to believe that the pieces had been Nazi loot.

See also 

 List of claims for restitution for Nazi-looted art
 Heinrich Rieger
 Eberhard W. Kornfeld
Dead City III

References

External links 
US v. Wally, 663 F. Supp. 2d 232 - Dist. Court, SD New York 2009

Austrian art collectors
Austrian ophthalmologists
Deaths from multiple organ failure
Physicians from Vienna
1925 births
2010 deaths
Recipients of the Austrian Cross of Honour for Science and Art, 1st class